USPP or U.S.P.P. may refer to:
 Ultra-short period planet
 United States Park Police
 United States Pirate Party
 United States Plant Patent
 United States presidential primary
 The ICAO airport code for Bolshoye Savino Airport